Polabi may refer to:

Polabians (tribe), medieval West Slavic tribe
Polabí, region of the Czech Republic